The 2013 Charlotte Hounds season is the second season for the Charlotte Hounds of Major League Lacrosse. The Hounds improved vastly upon their 5-9 2012 season. They clinched their first playoff spot in team history on August 3 by defeating the Hamilton Nationals, 14-11.

Roster

Schedule

Regular season

Standings

References

External links
 Team Website 

Major League Lacrosse seasons
Charlotte Hounds
Charlotte Hounds
Charlotte Hounds
Charlotte Hounds seasons